Snehikkan Samayamilla is a 1978 Indian Malayalam film,  directed by Vijay Anand and produced by Srikanth. The film stars Madhu, Jayan, Adoor Bhasi and Sankaradi in the lead roles. The film has musical score by A. T. Ummer.  The movie was based on 1968 Tamil hit movie Galatta Kalyanam starring Sivaji Ganesan and Jayalalitha.

Cast
Madhu
Jayan
Adoor Bhasi
Sankaradi
Janardanan
Kuthiravattam Pappu
Meena
Reena
Vijayalalitha

Soundtrack
The music was composed by A. T. Ummer and the lyrics were written by Sasthamangalam Raju and Dr. Balakrishnan.

References

External links
 

1978 films
1970s Malayalam-language films